Double Income, No Kids Yet is a British radio sitcom written by David Spicer and originally broadcast on BBC Radio 4 from June 2001 to November 2003. There were three series of six episodes each starring David Tennant as Daniel and Elizabeth Carling as Lucy, a childless couple in a world of people with children.

Cast
 David Tennant as Daniel
 Elizabeth Carling as Lucy
 Tony Gardner as Andy
 Meera Syal (series 1) / Samantha Spiro (series 2) / Tracy-Ann Oberman (series 3) as Katie
 Robert Harley as Peter
 Joanna Brookes as Allison

Episodes

Series One

Series Two

Series Three

References

BBC Radio comedy programmes